August Schmölzer (born 27 June 1958) is an Austrian actor and writer.

Filmography

Sources
http://www.imdb.com/name/nm0773590/

Living people
1958 births
Austrian male writers
Austrian male stage actors
Austrian male film actors
Austrian male television actors